Bolbostemma is a genus of flowering plants belonging to the family Cucurbitaceae.

Its native range is Southern Central China.

Species:

Bolbostemma biglandulosum 
Bolbostemma paniculatum

References

Cucurbitaceae
Cucurbitaceae genera